The 2004 Belgian Supercup was a football match between the winners of the previous season's Belgian First Division and Belgian Cup competitions. The match was contested by Cup winners Club Brugge, and 2004–05 Belgian First Division champions, Anderlecht on 22 December 2004 at the ground of the league champions as usual, in this case the Constant Vanden Stock Stadium.

Club Brugge won its twelfth supercup in total, as it beat Anderlecht 2-0 through goals by Sebastian Hermans and Rune Lange.

Following 2004 no cup winner has won the supercup and as such Club Brugge is the last team to have accomplished this.

Details

See also
2003–04 Belgian First Division
2003–04 Belgian Cup

References

Belgian Super Cup 2004
R.S.C. Anderlecht matches
Belgian Super Cup, 2004
Belgian Supercup
December 2004 sports events in Europe